John Tor Madira Machier (born December 13, 1990) is a South Sudanese journalist who serves as the editor-in-chief of Sudans Post newspaper since January 2020. He is also a co-founder of the newspaper, one of a few outlets in South Sudan. He worked for several media houses in both Sudan and South Sudan.

Early life 
Madira was born in Bentiu, the capital of South Sudan's Unity State. He lived his childhood there and worked as a teacher for the state ministry of education. He later on worked with the Bentiu Radio FM-99 as a freelance reporter until December 2013 when the South Sudanese Civil War broke out and fled to Egypt.

Career and threats by security agents 
Machier begun working as a freelance journalist around November 2013 at Bentiu Radio. He became a popular columnist and opinion writer in 2014 following the outbreak of civil war writing extensively against the atrocities of the government of President Salva Kiir Mayardit. He was hired to work for local news outlet Nyamilepedia as editor-in-chief in April 2018, but resigned due to lack of editorial impartiality from Nyamilepedia's higher management. 

In 2020, he become the editor in chief of Sudans Post and following the blocking of the news publication in Juba, security agents searched for him and phoned him in Cairo to show up for a meeting in an apparent set up to arrest and deport him back to South Sudan. He fled to hiding and was never arrested.

Controversy  
Madira triggered backlash from among the Sudanese public and army after deciding to adopt pro-Egyptian views when he claimed in July 2017 that the disputed regions of Halaib and Shalateen are Egyptian territories and that Egypt is not a national security threat. There were reports that he was later on approached by security operatives of the Sudanese intelligence in Cairo.

References

External links 
 Sudans Post
 Nyamilepedia
 Qurium Media Foundation
 Voice of America

South Sudanese journalists
Sudanese journalists
Mass media in Sudan
1990 births
Africa-focused media
African journalists
Living people